Znamianka is a town in Kropyvnytskyi Raion, Kirovohrad Oblast (province) of Ukraine. It hosts the administration of Znamianka urban hromada, one of the hromadas of Ukraine. Population: .

It is located about half way between the regional center Kropyvnytskyi (west), and cities of Oleksandriia (east) and Svitlovodsk (north).

History 

Znamianka was established in 1869 when there started train movement between Kharkiv and Odessa in area that historically was known as Black Forest (or Nigra Sylva). At the meadow of Black Forest, through which stretched a segment of Yelizavetgrad – Kriukov (west–east), there was built the train station main building and its offices.

To the area were resettled peasants from the Oryol Governorate area, possible the Russian Old Believers for whom the Our Lady of the Sign sacred. In Russian the Sign means Znamiennie, so in diminutive form the settlement's name became Znamianka.

In 1873 there was opened movement of trains on the segment Znamianka – Mykolaiv, in 1876 towards Fastiv. Out of a small train station Znamianka started to transform into a rail hub. Znamianka became a train station at four-way crossroads northeast towards Kremenchuk, south towards Mykolaiv, west towards Balta and northwest towards Fastiv.

Simultaneously with building of the train station on a land lot that was rent out from landowners Osipovs by people from neighboring villages and other counties (uyezds), there appeared a small settlement of railway workers, Osipovoye. In 1886 there already were 24 private houses, an earth shelter, six trading places and population of 143. Couple of dozens years later just south of the train station there appeared another settlement of Linitskoye. In 1913 in both Osipovoye and Linitskoye lived about 6,000 people.

In the beginning for sometime the train station was classified of the third category with its locomotive depot accounting for 4 locomotives. In December 1883 when there ended construction of the new train station building, there were 29 locomotives and the depot employed some 92 workers. In the 1890s the rail hub was shipping out some 580,000 poods of bread annually.

During the 1917 to 1921 Ukrainian War of Independence Znamianka was part of the Kholodny Yar Republic.

During World War II Znamianka was under German occupation  from August 5, 1941 to December 9, 1943.

In January 1989 the population was 33 828 people.

In 2012, based on the law "On the principles of the State language policy", City Council declared Znamianka's regional language to be Russian. On 28 February 2018 the Constitutional Court of Ukraine ruled this law unconstitutional.

In January 2013 the population was 23 983 people.

There is a memorial to the soldiers of the 5th Guards Tank Army, who liberated the town from the Germans. It takes the form of a tank mounted on a plinth.

Until 18 July 2020, Znamianka was designated as a city of oblast significance and belonged to Znamianka Municipality but not to Znamianka Raion even though it was the center of the raion. Znamianka Municipality combined the city of Znamianka, the urban-tye settlement of Znamianka Druha, and the village of Vodyane. As part of the administrative reform of Ukraine, which reduced the number of raions of Kirovohrad Oblast to four, Znamianka Municipality was merged into Kropyvnytskyi Raion.

Climate

Gallery

References

External links
 Volodymyr Panchenko. In the arms of the Black Forest (В обіймах Чорного лісу). The Ukrainian Week. 29 October 2017

Cities in Kirovohrad Oblast
Cities of regional significance in Ukraine
Railway towns in Ukraine